The Swedish Chef is a Muppet character that appeared on The Muppet Show. He was originally performed by Jim Henson and Frank Oz simultaneously, with Henson performing the head and voice and Oz performing the character with real hands. The Swedish Chef is currently performed by Bill Barretta. He is best known for his ridiculous cooking methods and the phrase "Bork, bork, bork!".

Character
A parody of television chefs, the Swedish Chef wears a toque blanche, has a thick brown moustache and has bushy eyebrows that completely obscure his eyes. He was one of the few Muppets to employ an actual puppeteer's visible hands, which extended from the ends of his sleeves and facilitated handling food and utensils. Frank Oz originally provided the character's hands.

Nearly all Swedish Chef sketches on The Muppet Show feature him in a kitchen, waving some utensils while singing an introductory song in a mock language – a semi-comprehensible gibberish supposedly mimicking Swedish phonology and prosody. The song's lyrics vary slightly from one episode to the next, but always end with "Bork, bork, bork!" as the Chef throws the utensils aside, occasionally knocking items off a shelf or the back wall in the process.

After this introduction, the Chef begins to prepare a recipe while giving a gibberish explanation of what he is doing. His commentary is spiced with the occasional English word to clue in the viewer to what he is attempting. These hints are necessary as he frequently uses unorthodox culinary equipment (firearms, sports equipment, hand tools, etc.) to prepare his dishes. (E.g. "See de moofin? Und here de boom-a-shootin" before tossing an English muffin into the air and blowing a hole through it with a blunderbuss to make a doughnut.) The sketch typically degenerates into a slapstick finale where the equipment or ingredients (often a live animal he is attempting to cook) get the better of him.

The Chef is referred to by name in one episode, in which Danny Kaye plays his uncle. Kaye reels off a very long name but adds, "But we call him Tom" – much to the Chef's amusement. In 2010, the Chef was seen wearing a wedding ring, implying that the character is married.

Inspiration
Some claim that the Swedish Chef was inspired by a real-life chef. One example is Friedman Paul Erhardt, a German American television chef known as "Chef Tell". Another example is Lars "Kuprik" Bäckman, a real-life Swedish chef. Bäckman claims that his rather unsuccessful appearance on an early edition of Good Morning America caught the attention of Jim Henson, who later bought the rights to the recording and created Bäckman's Muppet alter ego. Bäckman's Dalecarlian accent would explain the chef's strange pronunciation. Muppet writer Jerry Juhl denied Bäckman's story and insisted the character had no real-world counterpart: "I wrote, rehearsed, rewrote, brainstormed, and giggled uncontrollably a thousand times with Jim Henson as we dealt with the Swedish Chef, and I never once heard him mention an actual Swedish chef..."

According to Brian Henson, in one of his introductions for The Muppet Show, "[Jim Henson] had this tape that he used to play which was 'How to Speak Mock Swedish'. And he used to drive to work and I used to ride with him a lot. And he would drive to work trying to make a chicken sandwich in mock Swedish or make a turkey casserole in mock Swedish. It was the most ridiculous thing you had ever seen. And people at traffic lights used to stop and sort of look at him a little crazy. But that was the roots of the character that would eventually become the Swedish Chef."

When interviewed on the subject in Swedish magazine Expressen in 1985, Jim Henson claimed that "one of my writers came up with the idea that the chef should sound like the Swedish actors in Ingmar Bergman films".

Performance
The Swedish Chef is a variation of a live-hand Muppet. The Chef's lead performer, originally Jim Henson, uses their dominant hand to perform the character's head and mouth, and provides his mock Swedish dialogue. Both hands of a second puppeteer, originally Frank Oz, serve as those of the Chef, which, in a twist on the formula, are actual human hands instead of puppet gloves, allowing him to better interact with the food he prepares.

In recent years, the Chef has been sometimes seen wearing a wedding ring, one belonging to Steve Whitmire, who usually performed his hands during the majority of Bill Barretta's tenure as the character (since Whitmire's departure from The Muppets, Peter Linz has served as the Chef's hands).

In Sweden and other countries

The Muppets have not had the same cultural impact in Sweden as in the United States. A 2012 Slate article stated that "the fact that his nonsense words are so widely interpreted as Swedish-sounding is bewildering and annoying to Swedes" and argued that Swedes don't find the character funny at all; the author Jeremy Stahl quoted his wife who said the character "doesn't sound Swedish, doesn't act Swedish, and there's nothing Swedish about him. He's not funny." The linguist Tomas Riad said "it's not funny for us to laugh at. It's funny for other people to laugh at."

Appearances
Besides appearances in The Muppet Show, the chef also appears in The Muppet Movie (1979), The Great Muppet Caper (1981), The Muppets Take Manhattan (1984), The Muppets: A Celebration of 30 Years (1986), A Muppet Family Christmas (1987), Muppet*Vision 3D (1991), an attraction found at Disney's Hollywood Studios, The Muppet Christmas Carol (1992), Muppet Treasure Island (1996), Muppets From Space (1999), It's a Very Merry Muppet Christmas Movie (2002), Studio DC: Almost Live (2008), a sketch for the cast of The Suite Life of Zack & Cody and an episode with Hannah Montana star Jason Earles and Cory in the House star Jason Dolley, the Muppet viral video "Popcorn" (2010), The Muppets (2011), Muppets Most Wanted (2014), a regular role on The Muppets (2015), and also appearing as a guest alongside Miss Piggy on the 5th season of MasterChef Junior (2017). A younger version of the Swedish Chef appeared on the Disney Junior series Muppet Babies where he was referred to simply as Chef. The Swedish Chef has also appeared in a 2013 "This is SportsCenter" commercial with Robert Flores, Henrik Lundqvist, Steve Levy, and Linda Cohn. He appears in Muppets Now on the segment "Økėÿ Døkęÿ Køøkïñ" in which he competes against celebrity chefs.

See also
 Cröonchy Stars
 Swedish cuisine
 De Düva

References

External links
 

The Muppets characters
Fictional chefs
Fictional Swedish people
Television characters introduced in 1975

de:Die Muppet Show#Der dänische Koch